KSLE (104.7 FM, "Planet 104.7") is a radio station licensed to serve Wewoka, Oklahoma.  The station is owned by One Ten Broadcasting Group, Inc.  It airs an Oldies music format.

The station has been assigned these call letters by the Federal Communications Commission since October 1, 1999.

Office Location
KSLE-FM phone number is 405-273-5753 & 405- 382-0186.
KSLE-FM office address is located in the KIRC/ One Ten Broadcasting building at 2 East Main Street in Shawnee, Oklahoma 74804.

References

Also known in the late 80's as K105+Country, KSLE changed calls and moved up the dial to 105.9 KIRC

External links

SLE
Oldies radio stations in the United States